Bullinger is a surname. Notable people with the surname include:
Ethelbert William Bullinger (1837–1913), English clergyman, biblical scholar, and dispensationalist theologian
Heinrich Bullinger (1504–1575), Swiss reformer
Johann Balthasar Bullinger (1713–1793), Swiss landscapist,  portrayer, engraver and 1773 professor at the newly founded art school «Kunstschule Zürich»